Bossiaea dentata is a species of flowering plant in the family Fabaceae and is endemic to the south of Western Australia. It is an erect, sometimes prostrate shrub with variably-shaped leaves and greenish-yellow or pink to burgundy-coloured flowers.

Description
The edges of the leaves have irregular teeth and are sometimes rolled under.

Taxonomy and naming
This species was first formally described in 1812 by Robert Brown who gave it the name Scottia dentata in William Aiton's Hortus Kewensis. In 1864, George Bentham changed the name to Bossiaea dentata in Flora Australiensis. The specific epithet (dentata) means "toothed", referring to the edges of the leaves.

Distribution and habitat
This bossiaea grows in mallee, heath and scrub, often around large granite outcrops and is found from near Albany to the Cape Arid National Park and on some offshore islands, in the Esperance Plains, Jarrah Forest and Warren biogeographic regions of southern Western Australia.

Conservation status
Bossiaea dentata is classified as "not threatened" by the Government of Western Australia Department of Parks and Wildlife.

References

dentata
Eudicots of Western Australia
Plants described in 1812
Taxa named by Robert Brown (botanist, born 1773)